Dr. A.P.J. Abdul Kalam Technical University (AKTU), before 2015 as the Uttar Pradesh Technical University (UPTU), is a public collegiate university in Lucknow, Uttar Pradesh, India. It was established as the Uttar Pradesh Technical University through the Government of Uttar Pradesh on 8 May 2000. To reduce workload and to ensure proper management, the university was bifurcated into separate universities, Gautam Buddh Technical University (GBTU) and Mahamaya Technical University (MTU), with effect from 1 May 2010. In 2013, as a new government came into power, the university was formed again by combining the two on 5 January 2013.

It is an affiliating university, with approximately 800 colleges affiliated to it. The university was earlier on the IET Lucknow campus.  Now it is in its newly inaugurated campus in Jankipuram, Lucknow. Additionally, the university had a Centre and Regional Office in Noida, Uttar Pradesh.

History
Dr. A.P.J. Abdul Kalam Technical University, Lucknow formerly Uttar Pradesh Technical University (UPTU), was established by the government of Uttar Pradesh on 8 May 2000 (Act No. 1248 (2)XVII-V-I-I-19-2000 Uttar Pradesh Adhiniyam Sankhya 23 of 2000). Under the University Act, 'Technical Education' includes programmes of education, research, and training in engineering, technology, architecture, town planning, pharmacy, applied arts and crafts, and such other programmes and areas that the central government may declare by notification in the Gazette in consultation with All India Council for Technical Education (AICTE).

The university was bifurcated into the Mahamaya Technical University and Gautam Buddha Technical University as of 1 May 2010 for better management of education in the state. On 1 May 2013, the Uttar Pradesh government decided to merge GBTU and MTU to bring back the original form of UPTU. On 31 October 2013, GBTU and MTU merged back to UPTU, the university with the maximum number of colleges affiliated to it, in India. On 18 September 2015, the university was officially renamed as Dr. A.P.J. Abdul Kalam Technical University.

In February 2023, Alok Kumar Rai was appointed the vice-chancellor (additional charge) of the university.

Overview
The university is affiliating in nature and its jurisdiction spanned the state of Uttar Pradesh. It is one of the largest technical universities in India and perhaps in Asia. Because of its size, the number of colleges affiliated with it, and geographic dispersion, it is sub-divided into five zones with 45–50 colleges in each zone for the ease of management and facilitating inter-zonal comparison and possible internal competition to enhance the quality of teaching-learning processes.

The university envisioned to facilitate and nurture quality technical education and research in its own premises as well as all affiliated institutions. There were 49 affiliated colleges in 2000, now in August 2019, 785 colleges and institutions. The task of the university included conducting the SEE-UPTU for admission to programs affiliated with it. The university conducted central examinations each semester for all the affiliated colleges and institutions. Results were declared using technology-enabled systems. At present, in August 2019 around 4,00,000 students are enrolled in its programmes. The medium of instruction and examination is English.

As per a dipstick study conducted by MeritTrac in association with UPTU Watch magazine (2011), the engineering talent pool of the university was found to be significantly better than the national average.

Colleges

Constituent Colleges
 Institute of Engineering and Technology
 Faculty of Architecture
 Centre for Advanced Studies, Lucknow
 U.P. Institute of Design, Noida

Affiliated colleges

Formerly affiliated institutions
 Motilal Nehru National Institute of Technology (2000 to 2002)
 Madan Mohan Malaviya University of Technology (2000 to 2013)
 Harcourt Butler Technical University (2000 to 2016)
 Jauhar College of Engineering and Technology (2010 to 2014)
 Pharmacy College Saifai (2015 to 2016)

Courses offered
The university offers undergraduate courses in engineering, architecture, hotel management and catering technology, fashion and apparel design, and pharmacy. These lead to degrees of B.Tech, B.Arch, BHMCT, BFAD, and B.Pharma respectively. The university offers postgraduate courses in computer applications and business administration leading to degrees of MCA, MBA and MBA (Rural Development).

The university received its lowest number of applications in 2016, lowest in past 5 years.
The university offers training and placement support to affiliated colleges and institutes through the University industry interface cell(UIIC). The top colleges affiliated  to Dr. A.P.J. Abdul Kalam Technical University have been providing excellent placement record over the years.

Notable alumni
List of notable people who studied at Dr. A.P.J. Abdul Kalam Technical University, Lucknow.

Government and politics
 Sudhanshu Trivedi, MP
 Praveen Kumar Nishad, MP
 Yasar Shah, former MLA
 Abdullah Azam Khan, MLA
 Swati Maliwal, chairperson of Delhi Commission for Women
 Arun Verma, former MLA
 Utkarsh Verma, former MLA

Film and television
 Reecha Sinha, actress
 Malti Chahar, actress
 Prachi Mishra, actress
 Jitesh Singh Deo, actor

Entrepreneur and other
 Srijan Pal Singh, Author
 Ruchita Misra, Author
 Shishir Dua

Vice-chancellors

 Durg Singh Chauhan (26.07.2000 to 25.07.2006)
 R. K. Mittal (26.07.2006 to 30.07.2006)
 Prem Vrat (31.07.2006 to 30.07.2009)
 Kripa Shanker (31.07.2009 to 18.09.2012)
 R.K. Khandal (19.09.2012 to 29.04.2015)
 Onkar Singh (30.04.2015 to 03.08.2015)
 Vinay Kumar Pathak (August 2015 to August 2021)
 Vineet Kansal (August 2021 to January 2022)
 Pradeep Kumar Mishra (January 2022 onwards) https://aktu.ac.in/vice-chancellor-profile.html

See also
 Ghanshyam Binani

References

External links
 

 
Technical universities and colleges in India
Educational institutions established in 2000
Universities and colleges in Lucknow
Universities in Uttar Pradesh
2000 establishments in Uttar Pradesh
Technical University